Antisocial is a 2013 Canadian horror film and the feature film directorial debut of Cody Calahan. The film had its world premiere on 31 July 2013 at the Fantasia Film Festival and a sequel entitled Antisocial 2 was released in 2015. Both films predominantly center on Sam, a young woman that finds herself in the middle of a pandemic where disease sufferers suddenly begin showing strange symptoms and violent behavior.

Synopsis
Sam is a young college student that has recently been dumped by her boyfriend via video chat. To lift her spirits Sam decides to take her friend Mark up on his offer to attend a small New Year's Eve pre-party. Once there, things seem to be going well until their friend Jed turns on the television, which displays a news story about a seemingly isolated act of violence. The attack proves to be not so isolated as the group soon finds themselves the focus of an attack. Through the news and social media sites the group discovers that there is a new disease that causes various different symptoms, one of which is uncontrolled violence. They board themselves up in their lodgings and initially they believe that they will be fine until some of their friends begin to show symptoms of the disease. The film also follows Brian, a friend of Jed's that is confined to his dorm room and decides that he will chronicle the happenings online via a social media site named Social Redroom.

Cast
 Michelle Mylett as Sam Reznor
 Cody Ray Thompson as Mark Archibald
 Adam Christie as Jed Erickson
 Ana Alic as Kaitlin Cosgrove
 Romaine Waite as Steve McDonald
 Ry Barrett as Chad Wilson
 Eitan Shalmon as Brian
 Laurel Brandes as Tara Reiner
 Kate Vokral as Julia
 Charlie Hamilton as Dan Hamilton
 Colin Murphy as The Doctor

Reception
Critical reception to Antisocial has been predominantly negative and the film holds a rating of 14% at Rotten Tomatoes, based on 7 reviews.

Shock Till You Drop and Grolsch Film Works both panned the film, and Grolsch Film Works wrote that "This really is an idea for Generation 2.0 - but the social commentary is short-circuited by Antisocial'''s faulty wiring."

ScreenDaily and Dread Central praised the film, and Dread Central wrote "Overall, Antisocial'' is a solid Canadian horror film made for the Generation Y crowd and is surely able to crawl under the viewers' skin as it deals with a frightening concept far too relevant in our self-induced, isolated digital world."

References

External links
 

2013 films
2013 horror films
2010s science fiction horror films
Canadian science fiction horror films
English-language Canadian films
Films about viral outbreaks
Holiday horror films
Films set around New Year
Films about social media
2013 directorial debut films
2010s English-language films
2010s Canadian films